Following is a list of senators of Landes, people who have represented the department of Landes in the Senate of France.

Third Republic

Senators for Landes under the French Third Republic were:

 Henri (Gavardie) (1876–1888)
 Marie-Raymond de Lacroix (Ravignan) (1876–1888)
 Louis de Cès-Caupenne (1887–1892)
 Louis Pazat (1888–1897)
 Victor Lourties (1888–1920)
 Jean Demoulins (Riols) (1892–1897)
 Arthur Latappy (1897–1919)
 Raphaël Milliès-Lacroix (1897–1933)
 Charles Cadilhon (1920–1933)
 Ernest Daraignez (1920–1940)
 Victor Lourties (1933–1940)
 Eugène Milliès-Lacroix (1933–1940)

Fourth Republic

Senators for Landes under the French Fourth Republic were:

 Henri Monnet (1946–1948)
 Gérard Minvielle (1946–1959)
 André Darmanthé (1948–1955)
 Jean-Louis Fournier (1955–1959)

Fifth Republic 
Senators for Landes under the French Fifth Republic:

References

Sources

 
Lists of members of the Senate (France) by department